Riccardo Formosa (born 1 September 1954) is an Italian-born Australian musician and composer. He was the lead guitarist of the pop band Little River Band from 1975 to 1976 and recorded their first two albums, Little River Band and After Hours.

Early life
Formosa was born in Rome, Italy, but grew up in Montreal, Quebec, Canada. He migrated to Australia in 1974 and worked as a music arranger and studio musician. He joined the Little River Band shortly after arriving in Australia.

Little River Band

The original Little River Band (LRB) lead guitarist, Graham Davidge, played only on LRB's first recording session, a cover of The Everly Brothers' song When Will I Be Loved. Formosa replaced Davidge shortly after.

Formosa played on the first two LRB albums, Little River Band and After Hours, including the long guitar solo on It's a Long Way There on the former. For the latter, he wrote the song "Bourbon Street" and co-wrote "Another Runaway" with fellow member Beeb Birtles. Formosa toured Australia with LRB, playing 311 shows in 1975–1976. He was replaced by David Briggs in August 1976.

On 19 August 1980, Formosa joined an ensemble of pop artists in a memorial concert for Andrew Durant, the former Stars' guitarist-songwriter who had died earlier that year. Formosa played slide guitar, guitar and piano. A live double-LP, The Andrew Durant Memorial Concert, was released on Mushroom Records in 1980.

Composer
Formosa was awarded an Australia Council fellowship in 1983 and studied with Franco Donatoni at the Accademia Nazionale di Santa Cecilia in Rome and at the Accademia Musicale Chigiana in Siena. He also attended masterclasses in conducting with Franco Ferrara. On returning to Australia, Formosa worked for Victorian College of the Arts, the Victorian Arts Studio and Musica Viva. Formosa works as an arranger, conductor and studio musician for recordings, radio and television. He also has an extensive catalogue of compositions.

Awards
Formosa has won awards and commendations during his career, including:

Family
Formosa's daughter Antonella is a successful singer who performs and records as A-Love.

References

Further reading
Barkl, Michael. 2010. Vertigo:  Riccardo Formosa’s Composition Technique.  Saarbrücken.  
 Barkl, Michael. 1997.  Riccardo Formosa.  The Oxford Companion to Australian Music (ed. Warren Bebbington).  Melbourne:  OUP.

External links

1954 births
Living people
APRA Award winners
Australian film score composers
Male film score composers
Little River Band members
Musicians from Rome
Australian music arrangers
Italian emigrants to Australia
Australian record producers
Australian rock guitarists
Italian emigrants to Canada
Lead guitarists
Australian conductors (music)
21st-century conductors (music)
Australian male guitarists